The 2016 European Open was a men's tennis tournament played on indoor hard courts. It was the 1st edition of the European Open and part of the ATP World Tour 250 series of the 2016 ATP World Tour. It took place at the Lotto Arena in Antwerp, Belgium, from October 17 to October 23.

Singles main-draw entrants

Seeds

1 Rankings are as of October 10, 2016

Other entrants
The following players received wildcards into the singles main draw:
  Steve Darcis
  Joris De Loore
  Tommy Robredo

The following players received entry from the qualifying draw:
  Michael Berrer
  Marius Copil
  Jozef Kovalík
  Yannick Maden

Withdrawals
Before the tournament
  Borna Ćorić →replaced by   Íñigo Cervantes
  Alexandr Dolgopolov →replaced by   Jan-Lennard Struff

Doubles main-draw entrants

Seeds

1 Rankings are as of October 10, 2016

Other entrants
The following pairs received wildcards into the doubles main draw:
  Kimmer Coppejans /  Taylor Fritz
  Steve Darcis /  Joris De Loore

Withdrawals
During the tournament
  Paul-Henri Mathieu (left hip injury)

Finals

Singles 

  Richard Gasquet defeated  Diego Schwartzman, 7–6(7–4), 6–1

Doubles 

  Daniel Nestor /  Édouard Roger-Vasselin defeated  Pierre-Hugues Herbert /  Nicolas Mahut, 6–4, 6–4

External links 
 

2016
2016 ATP World Tour
2016 in Belgian tennis